The Evans Site (32MN301) is a Native American site located in northwestern North Dakota north of New Town.  It was listed on the National Register of Historic Places in 1980.  The site is a multicomponent campsite.  It was surveyed by archaeologists Fred E. Schneider and Jeff Kinney in the late 1970s.  Items found at the site include Avonlea projectile points and sherds of ceramics and Mortlach wares.

References

Archaeological sites on the National Register of Historic Places in North Dakota
Native American history of North Dakota
National Register of Historic Places in Mountrail County, North Dakota
Mandan, Hidatsa, and Arikara Nation